Maximin or Maximinus or similar may refer to:

People 
Maximinus Thrax (173–238), Roman emperor, also known as Maximinus I
Maximinus II (270–313), Roman emperor, also known as Maximinus Daia
Gaius Julius Verus Maximus (died 238; 217/220–238), also incorrectly known as Maximinus the Younger, Caesar of Rome, son of Maximinus I
Saint Maximin of Trier (died 346), French-born bishop of Trier, Germany
Saint Maximinus of Aix (Maximin d'Aix), traditionally named as the first bishop of Aix and a figure in the legend of Mary Magdalene, often conflated in the Middle Ages with Maximin of Trier
Maximinus (praetorian prefect) (fl. 4th century), Roman officer and barrister
Maximinus (diplomat) (fl. 5th century), Byzantine ambassador to Attila the Hun
Saint Mesmin or Maximin (died 520), French saint
Maximin Isnard (1755–1825), French revolutionary
Maximin Giraud (1835–1875), French Marian visionary
Maximilian Kronberger (1888–1904), known as Maximin, German poet
Maximino Ávila Camacho (1891–1945), Mexican revolutionary general (brother of President Camacho)
Rayo de Jalisco Sr. (Máximino "Max" Linares Moreno, 1932–2018), former Mexican luchador
Max León (Maximino León Molino, born 1950), Mexican former baseball pitcher
Maximin Coia (born 1983), French pair skater
Daniel Maximin (born 1947), Guadeloupean writer
Maximin Alff (1866–1927), reverend in the Congregation of the Sacred Hearts of Jesus and Mary
Maximin de Bompart (1698–1773), French naval officer, colonial administrator, and Governor of Martinique
Juventinus and Maximinus (died 363), members of the imperial guard of Emperor Julian
Mariani Maximin (1914–2011), politician from Guadeloupe

Other uses 
Maximin (decision theory), also known as minimax, a strategy to maximize the minimum possible payback
Maximin (philosophy), a principle regarding how justice relates to inequality

See also 
Maximianus (disambiguation)
Saint-Maximin (disambiguation)